Happy Camp Airport  is a public airport located in the city of Happy Camp, serving Siskiyou County, California, United States. It has one runway and is mostly used for general aviation.

Facilities 
Happy Camp Airport has one runway:

 Runway 4/22: 3,000 x 50 ft (914 x 15 m), surface: asphalt

References 
 Official website by County of Siskiyou
 Airport Master Record (FAA Form 5010), also available as a printable form (PDF)

External links

Airports in Siskiyou County, California